The Chaouacha (or Chawasha) were an indigenous people of Louisiana, likely related to the Chitimacha, best known in history for being the victims of a massacre in retaliation for the Natchez revolt against French colonists in which they had had no part.  When first described, they lived on the east bank of the Mississippi River, just south of New Orleans. In 1699, they were reported to be allied with the Ouacha/Washa and the Opelousa.

In December 1729, following an attack by the Natchez on Fort Rosalie the prior month, colonists feared a widespread Indian rebellion or, even worse, a combined Native American and slave revolt. The governor of Louisiana, Étienne Perier, ordered a force of 80 enslaved Africans under the command of Louis Tixerant, a Company of the Indies warehouse keeper, to massacre the Chaouacha community, rewarding the men by freeing them from slavery. At least seven Chaouacha men were killed and a number of women and children were captured and taken to New Orleans. Survivors from the tribe petitioned Perier to release the prisoners, as the tribe was not involved in the Natchez revolt, which he did. The Choctaw, who were allied with the French against the Natchez, objected to Perier's attack on the Chaouacha and encouraged other small tribes in the region to relocate away from the French to lands under Choctaw protection.

Perier reported to his superiors that he had destroyed the Chaouacha, but there is evidence the tribe remained distinct until the late 1700s before assimilating into other tribes. An 1802 mention by French colonist Baudry de Lozières describes them as "Tchaouachas: Reduced to 40 warriors. A wandering indolent and lazy nation, settled near the French in 1712. Corn is the only assistance one can expect of them."

References

Chitimacha
Native American tribes in Louisiana
Indigenous peoples of the Southeastern Woodlands
Ethnic cleansing in North America
Indian massacres
History of New France
Extinct ethnic groups
Extinct Native American peoples